This is a list of television stations in the Tamil language.

India

Government owned channel
DD Podhigai - GEC from Doordharshan for Tamil Nadu.

General entertainment channels
Star Vijay - part of Star India
Colors Tamil - part of Viacom 18
Jaya TV - part of Jaya TV Network
Kalaignar TV - part of Kalaignar TV Network
Makkal TV 
Mega TV - part of Mega TV Network
Polimer TV
Puthuyugam TV - part of New Generation Media Corporation
Raj TV - part of Raj Television Network
Sun TV - part of Sun TV Network
Vendhar TV - part of SRM Group
Zee Tamil - part of Zee Entertainment Enterprises

Movie channels
J Movies - part of Jaya TV Network
KTV - part of Sun TV Network
Mega 24 - part of Mega TV Network
Raj Digital Plus - part of Raj Television Network
Sony Pix - part of Sony Entertainment Television - with Tamil audio feed
Star Movies - part of Star India with Tamil audio feed only on Saturdays
&flix - part of Zee Entertainment Enterprises  - with Tamil audio feed
Vijay Super - part of STAR India
Zee Thirai - part of Zee Entertainment Enterprises

Music channels
Raj Musix - part of Raj Television Network
Star Vijay Music - part of Star India
Sun Music - part of Sun TV Network

Classic channels
Murasu TV - part of Kalaignar TV network
Sun Life - part of Sun TV Network

News channels

Captain News - part of Captain Media Network
Lotus News - Seventh Vision India Private Limited
News18 Tamil Nadu - part of  Network 18
News7 Tamil - part of VV Group
Polimer News
Seithigal 24/7 - part of Kalaignar TV (P) Ltd.
Sun News - part of Sun TV Network
Thanthi TV - part of Dina Thanthi

Comedy channels
Adithya TV - part of Sun TV Network
Sirippoli - part of Kalaignar TV (P) Ltd.

Kids channels
Cartoon Network - with Tamil audio feed
Chithiram TV - part of Kalaignar TV (P) Ltd.
Chutti TV - part of Sun TV Network
Discovery Kids - with Tamil audio feed
Discovery Channel - with Tamil audio feed
Disney Junior - with Tamil audio feed
ETV Bala Bharat - part of ETV Network
Hungama TV - with Tamil audio feed
Marvel HQ - with Tamil audio feed
Nickelodeon - with Tamil audio feed
Nickelodeon Sonic - with Tamil audio feed
Pogo - with Tamil audio feed
Sony Yay - with Tamil audio feed

Sports Channels
Sony Ten 4 - with Tamil audio feed
Star Sports 1 Tamil - separate channel for Tamil, part of  Star India

Infotainment channels
Animal Planet - with Tamil audio feed
Discovery Channel HD - with Tamil audio feed (HD Version)
D Tamil (Discovery Tamil) - separate channel for Tamil, part of Discovery Networks Asia Pacific
Fox Life - with Tamil audio feed
History TV18 - with Tamil audio feed
National Geographic - with Tamil audio feed
Nat Geo Wild - with Tamil audio feed
Sony BBC Earth - with Tamil audio feed
Travel XP Tamil - separate channel for Tamil, part of Celebrities Management Private Limited

Shopping Channels
HomeShop18 Tamil - 24X7 Home Shopping Channel

Devotional
Sri Sankara TV - Tamil and Kannada Hindu spiritual channel
SVBC 2 - Tamil Hindu spiritual channel

Malaysia
Astro Box Office Movies Thangathirai - Tamil's hottest movies channel
Astro Vaanavil - Tamil entertainment channel
Astro Vellithirai - Tamil movie channel
Astro Vinmeen HD - Tamil entertainment channels in HD
Yupp Thirai, Tamil movie channel.

Singapore
MediaCorp TV12 Vasantham - part of government owned MediaCorp TV12
Vannathirai

Sri Lanka
Nethra TV - entertainment; government owned by the SLRC, timeshift programming with Channel Eye
Shakthi TV - entertainment; part of privately owned MTV Channel network, broadcasting in Sri Lanka
Star Tamil TV - general entertainment; part of privately owned Voice of Asia Network
Udhayam Tv - entertainment, privately owned by the SATIS Agency (Pvt) Ltd
Vasantham TV - general entertainment; part of government owned Independent Television Network group

Canada
ATN Jaya TV - cable TV
Star Vijay - cable TV
Tamil One - cable TV, previously known as Tamil TV
Tamil Vision International - cable TV
TET - a part of Raj TV

International
Deepam TV; pro-Tamil; previously known as Thendral TV and Tharisanam TV
IBC Tamil  - London based news channel
Tamil Television Network - France based

Internet Protocol Television
TVI On Demand

All Tamil HD Channels

India
Colors Tamil HD
KTV HD
STAR Vijay HD
Sun Music HD
Sun TV HD
Zee Tamil HD

Canada
TET

Malaysian Peninsula
Astro Vinmeen HD
MediaCorp TV12 Vasantham HD

Audio feed

Kids
Nick HD+

Infotainment
Discovery HD
Fox Life HD
fyi TV18 HD
History TV 18 TRUE HD
Nat Geo HD
Nat Geo Wild HD

See also
List of 4K channels in India
List of Kannada-language television channels
List of Malayalam-language television channels
List of Tamil-language radio stations
List of Telugu-language television channels

References

Lists of television channels by language
Lists of television channels in India
 
Channels